Skip is a nickname (for example, when a name has skipped a generation), or a short form of the given name Skipper. Notable people with the name include:

In arts and entertainment
 Skip Arnold (born 1957), American contemporary artist
 Skip Battin (1934–2003), American singer-songwriter
 Skip Battaglia (born 1948), American filmmaker
 Skip Blumberg (born 1946), American TV producer
 Skip Bolen (born 1960), American photographer
 Skip Drinkwater, American record producer
 Skip Ewing (born 1964), American country music singer and songwriter
 Skip Groff (1948-2019), American record producer
 Skip Hahn (born 1951), American musician
 Skip Hall (musician) (born 1909), American musician
 Skip Heitzig (born 1955), American pastor
 Skip Heller (born 1965), American singer-songwriter
 Skip Hinnant (born 1940), American actor and comedian
 Skip Hollandsworth (born 1957), American author
 Skip Homeier (1930-2017), American actor
 Skip Horack (born 1976), American writer
 Skip James (1902–1969), American singer
 Skip Jensen (born 1967), Canadian singer-songwriter
 Skip Jones, American folk musician
 Skip Kelly (born 1973), American radio personality
 Skip Konte (born 1944), American keyboardist
 Skip Lievsay, American sound editor
 Skip E. Lowe (1929-2014), American actor
 Skip Marley (born 1996), Jamaican singer-songwriter
 Skip Martin (1916–1976), American saxophonist
 Skip Mercier, American costume designer
 Skip Miller (1946-2009), American record executive
 Skip O'Brien (1950-2011), American actor
 Skip Palenik (born 1946), American author
 Skip Prokop (1943-2017), Canadian drummer
 Skip Scarborough (1944-2003), American songwriter
 Skip Sempé (born 1958), American harpsichordist
 Skip Spence (1946–1999), American-Canadian singer
 Skip Stellrecht (born 1959), American actor
 Skip Stephenson (1940-1992), American actor
 Skip Weshner (1927-1995), American disc jockey
 Skip Williams, American game designer
 Skip Williamson (1944-2017), American cartoonist
 Skip Williamson (producer) (born 1964), American producer
 Skip Woods (born 1970), American screenwriter

In sports
 Skip Alexander (1918-1997), American golfer
 Skip Bandini, American football player
 Skip Barber (born 1936), American retired race car driver
 Skip Bayless (born 1951), American sports columnist and TV personality
 Skip Bertman (born 1938), American former college baseball coach and athletic director at Louisiana State University
 Skip Brown (born 1955), American basketball player
 Skip Butler (born 1947), American former National Football League placekicker
 Skip Caray (1939-2008), American sportscaster, son of Harry Caray
 Skip Chappelle, American basketball player
 Skip Cutting (born 1946), American cyclist
 Skip Engblom (born 1948), American skateboarder
 Skip Frye (born 1941), American surfer 
 Skip Gilbert (born 1960), American soccer player
 Skip Gougler (1894-1962), American football player
 Skip Guinn (born 1944), American baseball player
 Skip Hall (born  1944), American football coach
 Skip Hall (martial artist) (born 1948), American mixed martial artist
 Skip Harlicka (born 1946), American basketball player
 Skip Henderson (born 1965), American basketball player
 Skip Hicks (born 1974), American retired National Football League running back
 Skip Holtz (born 1964), head football coach at Louisiana Tech University and former head coach of the University of South Florida
 Skip James (baseball) (born 1949), American professional baseball player
 Skip Johnson (born 1967), American baseball player
 Skip Jutze (born 1946), American former Major League Baseball catcher
 Skip Kendall (born 1964), American golfer
 Skip Kenney, American head coach
 Skip Krake (born 1943), Canadian former National Hockey League player
 Skip Lane (born 1960), American football player
 Skip Lockwood (born 1946), American retired Major League Baseball pitcher
 Skip Manning (born 1945), American former NASCAR driver
 Skip McClendon (born 1964), American football player
 Skip Mills (born 1985), American basketball player
 Skip Minisi (1926-2005), American college and National Football League halfback, member of the College Football Hall of Fame
 Skip Peete (born 1963), American college football player and college and National Football League coach
 Skip Phoenix (born 1948), Canadian driver
 Skip Pitlock (born 1947), American former Major League Baseball pitcher
 Skip Prosser (1950-2007), American college basketball coach
 Skip Roderick (born 1966), American soccer player
 Skip Stanowski (born 1944), Canadian ice hockey player
 Skip Schumaker (born 1980), American Major League Baseball player
 Skip Seagraves (born 1982), American football player
 Skip Stahley (1908-1992), American college football coach and athletic director
 Skip Storch (born 1957), American swimmer
 Skip Sweetser (born 1936), American rower
 Skip Teal (1933-2006), Canadian professional ice hockey centre
 Skip Thomas (1950-2011), American former National Football League cornerback
 Skip Thoren (born 1943), American basketball player
 Skip Vanderbundt (born 1946), American football player
 Skip Wilson, retired college baseball head coach
 Skip Wise (born 1955), American basketball player
 Skip Wolters (born 1929), Singaporean water polo player
 Skip Wymard (1890-1970), American football player
 Skip Young (wrestler) (1951-2010), American professional wrestler

In politics
 Skip Bafalis (born 1929), American politician
 Skip Brion, American politician
 Skip Campbell (1948-2018), American politician
 Skip Carnine (born 1941), American retired politician and educator
 Skip Cleaver (1944-2022), American politician
 Skip Daly (born 1959), American politician
 Skip Finn (1948-2018), American politician
 Skip Humphrey (born 1942), American former politician, Minnesota attorney general and state senator
 Skip Priest (born 1950), American politician
 Skip Rimsza (born 1955), American politician
 Skip Rollins, American politician

Other
 Skip Garibaldi, American mathematician
 Skip Holm (born 1944), American fighter, test and racing pilot
 Skip Novak, American sailor, mountaineer and author
 Skip Prichard, American business executive
 Skip Rutherford (born 1950), American non-profit executive and academic administrator
 Skip Stewart (born 1968), American aerobatic and commercial pilot
 Skip Triplett, Canadian former president of Kwantlen Polytechnic University, Vancouver, British Columbia

See also
 Skippy (nickname)

Lists of people by nickname